Garcinia indica, a plant in the mangosteen family (Clusiaceae), commonly known as kokum, is a fruit-bearing tree that has culinary, pharmaceutical, and industrial uses. It primarily grows in the Western Ghats, especially the Goa and Konkan region.

Taxonomy

The genus Garcinia, belonging to the family Clusiaceae, includes about 200 species found in the Old World tropics, mostly in Asia and Africa. Garcinia indica is an evergreen, monoecious tree, which can grow up to 18 meters high, on maturity attaining a pyramid shape.

The fruit, an orange-sized purple berry with fleshy endocarp, contains five to eight seeds, which account for 20–23% of the fruit's weight. The kernels account for 61 percent of the weight of the seed and about 44% of its oil. The seeds are compressed and embedded in an acidic pulp.

Distribution
Garcinia indica is indigenous to the tropical forest regions of India. Of the 35 species found in India, 17 are endemic. Of these, seven are endemic to the Western Ghats, six in the Andaman and Nicobar Islands and four in the northeastern region of India. The kokum variety from the Ratnagiri and Sindhudurg districts  from the coastal Konkan region of the state of Maharashtra in India has received  the GI (Geographical Indication) tag.

Garcinia indica is found in forest lands, riversides and wastelands. These plants prefer evergreen forests, but sometimes they also thrive in areas with relatively low rainfall. It is also cultivated on a small scale.  It does not require irrigation, spraying of pesticides or fertilizers.

Uses

Culinary uses

It is used as a souring  agent typically in Maharashtra, Assam, Karnataka, Goa, Gujarat. Kokum yields a peculiar flavour and deep-red colour. As a souring agent, it is used as an alternative to tamarind in curries and other dishes from south India. It is also used in cuisine from Gujarat, where it is frequently used to add flavor and tartness to dal (lentil soup) for flavor balance. It is extensively used in Assamese cuisine in many dishes like masor tenga (sour fish curry) and tenga dali (sour dal).

The fresh fruit is preserved with sugar to make bright-red squash that is diluted with water and bottled for sale as a beverage called Kokum Sarbat.

The extract of the fruit is called  in Konkani and Marathi.

Industrial uses
The seed of Garcinia indica contains 23–26% Kokum butter, which remains solid at room temperature. It is used in the preparation of chocolate and sugar confectionery.

Medicinal and cosmetics applications
The oily extract called Kukum butter  is used in ointments and suppositories. It has application in skin and hair products, acne products and skin tonics.

The rind of the fruit is a good source of hydroxycitric acid which has been claimed to modify lipid metabolism.

Other uses
The tree is ornamental, with a dense canopy of green leaves and red-tinged, tender, young leaves.

Gallery

References

External links

Plant database

indica
Spices
Sour fruits
Medicinal plants of Africa
Medicinal plants of Asia
Tropical fruit
Flora of India (region)
Indian spices
Maharashtrian cuisine